Alexander Dück also spelled Dueck (born April 22, 1980) is a German former professional ice hockey defenceman. He most recently played with Ravensburg Towerstars of the DEL2. Dueck played a solitary season for the Hamburg Freezers during the 2010–11 season. He then returned to the Krefeld Pinguine for the following 2011–12 season on May 11, 2011.

Dück mirrored his previous season and totaled 5 points in 52 games with the Pinguine. A free agent at season's end, Dück made a return to his original DEL and youth club, Schwenninger Wild Wings on July 13, 2012. He competed and Captained the Wild Wings in the 2nd Bundesliga during the 2012–13 season, scoring 17 points in 48 games to help reach the finals. With Schwenninger welcomed back to the DEL for the 2013–14 season, Dueck re-signed with the club on a one-year extension on March 7, 2013.

Career statistics

References

External links

1980 births
Sportspeople from Karaganda
Kazakhstani people of German descent
German ice hockey defencemen
Hamburg Freezers players
HK Acroni Jesenice players
Iserlohn Roosters players
Krefeld Pinguine players
Living people
Schwenninger Wild Wings players